Naarmalcha (Grecized form of the Aramaic Nahar Malkā, meaning the King's Canal or the Royal Canal; in  Nahr al-Malik) was a river or canal in central Babylonia that linked Euphrates and Tigris rivers. It corresponds to the older Royal River (Akkadian: nār šarri;  Naarsárēs) in the Assyriological sources.

See also
Nehardea
Julian's Persian War

References

Irrigation canals
Euphrates
Tigris River
Ancient Mesopotamia
Sasanian Empire